Dehnow-e Fath ol Mobin (also Romanized as Dehnow-e Fatḥ ol Mobīn; also known as Dehno-e Fatḥolmobīn) is a village in Ganjabad Rural District, Esmaili District, Anbarabad County, Kerman Province, Iran. At the 2006 census, its population was 452, in 102 families.

References 

Populated places in Anbarabad County